Sean Conway (1931 – 27 September 1995) was a Fianna Fáil politician from County Meath in Ireland. He was a senator from 1982 to 1983.

Conway was a pharmacist who stood unsuccessfully as a Fianna Fáil candidate for Dáil Éireann in the Meath constituency at three successive general elections: 1981, February 1982 and November 1982. After his February 1982 defeat, he was elected to the 16th Seanad Éireann on the Administrative Panel, but was defeated in the 1983 election to the 17th Seanad.

References

1931 births
1995 deaths
Fianna Fáil senators
Members of the 16th Seanad
Politicians from County Meath